The Whirl Pool Dips was a roller coaster located at Tolchester Beach Park in Tolchester Beach, Maryland. It operated from 1913 until 1959.

References

Former roller coasters in Maryland